The National-Democratic Party of Germany was an East German political party that served as a satellite party to the Socialist Unity Party of Germany (SED) from 1948 to 1989, representing former members of the Nazi Party, the Wehrmacht and middle classes. It should not be confused with the National Democratic Party of Germany (Nationaldemokratische Partei Deutschlands, NPD), which was a party in West Germany and continues as a minor non-governmental party in the modern united Germany.

History
The NDPD was co-founded by Lothar Bolz (a former member of the Communist Party of Germany and the National Committee for a Free Germany in the Soviet Union), Wilhelm Adam (a former member of the SA) and others. It was intended to reach out to social groups that had been attracted by the Nazi Party (NSDAP) before 1945 (such as military men and some of the middle classes) and provide them with a political outlet, so that they would not be tempted to support the far-right again or turn to the anti-communist Western Allies.  German nationalism had been a potent force during the interwar era and millions of Germans had been members of the NSDAP, and Stalin wanted to use them to create a new pro-Soviet and anti-Western strain in German politics. According to top Soviet diplomat Vladimir Semyonov, Stalin even suggested that they could be allowed to continue publishing their own newspaper, Völkischer Beobachter. German Communists and some Soviet officials were initially appalled by Stalin's ideas and were not enthusiastic in their implementation. Instead, the party launched a regional daily, Mitteldeutsche Neueste Nachrichten, in 1952.

In addition to old NSDAP members, former officers and displaced persons were also to be intercepted by the new party, like the West German All-German Bloc/League of Expellees and Deprived of Rights and the Austrian Federation of Independents. The Socialist Unity Party of Germany (SED) Board, meeting in May 1948, stated that "these politically unclear people" should not vote "cadets" for the bourgeois parties CDU and LDP at the next election, like the West German CDU and FDP.

According to Klaus Schroeder, the NDPD had fewer former Nazis among its ranks than the communist SED had. This was due to the NDPD being much smaller than the SED.

The NDPD was recognized by the Soviet Military Administration in Germany on 16 August 1948 and later sent 52 delegates to the East German parliament, the Volkskammer, as part of the National Front. None of these ever voted against the government on any issue, similarly to other block parties which were effectively puppets of the ruling party, the SED. 

Nonetheless, after the fall of the Berlin Wall, the NDPD became an independent agent in politics, participating in the only free Volkskammer election ever held (on 18 March 1990). NDPD was not included in the electoral cartel of the other liberal-to-be parties in East Germany and entered the race alone. The results were a debacle: with 44,292 votes (0.38%) they received fewer votes than they (nominally) had members. On 27 March 1990 the NDPD became part of the Bund Freier Demokraten, a short-lived organization that eventually merged into the Free Democratic Party (FDP).

Programme and ideology 
The NDPD programme demanded, among other things, the promotion of the middle class. Bolz was one of the few prominent members who was not a former Nazi and was, in fact, a member of the SED until he founded the new party. He had previously been a member of the Communist Party of Germany until it was suppressed by the Nazis. The NDPD was established by the communist authorities with the aim of claiming support among these ranks of society. The NDPD was organised on democratic centralist grounds and had 110,000 members in the late 1980s.

The party was supposed to represent liberalism, like the Liberal Democratic Party of Germany, and (at least initially) also played with the German national sentiment.  However, the NDPD was even more loyal to the SED and was reluctant to criticise the government even during the Peaceful Revolution of 1989.

After the revolution, there were attempts by the far-right National Democratic Party (NPD) and the right-wing populist The Republicans to win the NDPD as an ally, but this failed.

Later, the NDPD understood itself as a centrist party and distanced itself from communist and nationalist/neo-fascist endeavors. Likewise, they were pro-European and rejected designation as "right-wing party", right-wing national or national conservative. It was also argued to rename the party "New Democratic Party of Germany".

Chairmen of the NDPD

Electoral history 

Volkskammer elections

See also 

Politics of East Germany
National Front (East Germany)

References

External links
Nationaldemokratische Partei Deutschlands from chronik der wende 
FDP takes over 'Block flutes'(In German)

1948 establishments in Germany
1990 disestablishments in East Germany
Conservative parties in Germany
Defunct political parties in Germany
Free Democratic Party (Germany)
German nationalist political parties
German veterans' organisations
Landsmannschaften
Liberal parties in Germany
National liberal parties
Nationalist parties in Germany
Political parties disestablished in 1990
Political parties established in 1948
Political parties in East Germany